Greenwood station is an Amtrak intercity train station in Greenwood, Mississippi, United States. It is a stop on Amtrak's City of New Orleans line. The red brick depot was built around 1917 by the Yazoo & Mississippi Valley Railroad, a subsidiary of the Illinois Central Railroad. It is located in Greenwood's Railroad Historic District, added to the National Register of Historic Places in 1985.

References

External links 

Greenwood Amtrak Station (USA Rail Guide -- Train Web)

Amtrak stations in Mississippi
National Register of Historic Places in Leflore County, Mississippi
Former Illinois Central Railroad stations
Railway stations in the United States opened in 1917
Yazoo and Mississippi Valley Railroad
Railway stations on the National Register of Historic Places in Mississippi